Lieutenant Cyril Herbert Barclay Catford (September, 1890 - 5 October 1916) was a British army officer in the Durham Light Infantry. He died at Battle of the Somme. His final letters are preserved at the Durham County Record Office.

Early life 
Cyril Catford was born in New Barnet to Mr and Mrs Herbert Catford. He married Rosalind Ruth Jarmand in 1915 and they lived in Steeple Morden, Royston, Hertfordshire. Their son, Captain Herbert Ellis Cyril Barclay Catford, later served in the Durham Light Infantry in the Second World War.

First World War 
Catford was commissioned as a Lieutenant into the 6th Battalion, Durham Light Infantry. While serving on the Western Front, he wrote for The Whizz-Bang, a monthly magazine written and edited by British soldiers in the trenches.

In September 1916, Catford's company took part in the Battle of the Somme. As of 25 September, they had been able to capture positions without significant fighting and had suffered only 15 casualties.

Over the following five days, in advance of the next push, a number of Catford's men and fellow officers were killed or left with shell shock.

Catford was injured in the following attack and subsequently died of his wounds on 5 October.

Memorial 

In addition to his Commonwealth war grave at Dernancourt, a statue by Nathaniel Hitch was erected in his memory at St Mark's Church, Barnet Vale.

His final letters are preserved by the Durham County Record Office and are sometimes read at British Remembrance Day services.

References 

British Army personnel of World War I
British military personnel killed in World War I
Durham Light Infantry officers
1890 births
1916 deaths